The family with sequence similarity 73, member B, also known as FAM73B, is a human gene.

Model organisms

Model organisms have been used in the study of FAM73B function. A conditional knockout mouse line, called Fam73btm1a(KOMP)Wtsi was generated as part of the International Knockout Mouse Consortium program — a high-throughput mutagenesis project to generate and distribute animal models of disease to interested scientists.

Male and female animals underwent a standardized phenotypic screen to determine the effects of deletion. Twenty four tests were carried out on mutant mice and six significant abnormalities were observed. Homozygous mutant animals had a decreased body weight, altered body composition, abnormal tooth morphology, hypoalbuminemia, decreased bone mineral content and strength, and an increased susceptibility to bacterial infection.

References

Further reading 
 

Genes mutated in mice